The title of Fiesta of International Tourist Interest is an honorary distinction that is given in Spain by the General Secretariat of Tourism of the Ministry of Industry, Tourism and Trade of the Government of Spain to the fiestas or events involving manifestations of cultural and popular tradition, with particular regard to their ethnic characteristics and special importance as tourist attractions. This honorary title is held by 30 fiestas in Spain.

The requirements include:
 Antiquity of the celebration and continuity over time (at least should be held each five years).
 Popular roots and participation, especially value the existence of associations that support it.
 Originality, diversity that are relevant in terms of promoting tourism of Spain abroad.
 Impact on international media, at least ten performances in one or more foreign media.
 Possess the declaration of National Tourist Interest for at least five years.
 That its development involve no mistreatment of people or animals, and care for the city, architecture and landscape.
 Existence in the town or within  of suitable accommodation and tourist services.
 Full Town Council agreement and a favorable report from the Autonomous Community.

Fiestas

See also 
Fiestas of National Tourist Interest of Spain

References

External links 
 ORDER ITC/1763/2006, May 3, by this it regulates the declaration of national and international tourist interest.
 Local fiestas of Spain of International Tourist Interest (lay) Calendar formats iCalendar.
 Local fiestas of Spain of International Tourist Interest (religious) Calendar formats iCalendar.

Spanish culture
Cultural tourism in Spain